The XV SS Cossack Cavalry Corps was a cavalry corps in the armed forces of Nazi Germany during World War II.

Background

During the Russian Civil War (1917–1923), Cossack leaders and their governments generally sided with the White movement. After the Soviets emerged victorious in the civil war, a policy of decossackization was instituted between 1919 and 1933, aimed at the elimination of the Cossacks as a separate ethnic and political group. Cossacks in exile joined other Russian émigré groups in Central and Western Europe, while those in Russia endured continual repression.

In October 1942, the Germans established a semi-autonomous Cossack District in the Kuban. This put them in a position to recruit Cossacks from these areas and mobilize them against the Red Army. This was in contrast to soldiers of the ROA, who had been recruited from POW camps and Red Army defections, most soldiers of the German Cossack units had never been citizens of the Soviet Union.

History
In the summer of 1944 Heinrich Himmler and the SS became interested in gaining control of the 1st Cossack Division under Helmuth von Pannwitz. In July 1944 Himmler discussed the organization of a Cossack fighting unit in the Bialystok region and requested from Hitler, that the Cossack Division would be placed in the organizational structure of the SS. On 26 August 1944 he met with Pannwitz and his Chief of Staff. Himmler planned to gather all Cossack units to form a second Cossack division and proposed the transfer of the 1st Cossack division to the SS. All units were to be placed under von Pannwitz's command. Though initially reluctant, Pannwitz eventually agreed to place his division under SS administration. Both German cadre and Cossack troops would retain their traditional uniforms and their Wehrmacht or Cossack rank. Pannwitz hoped to raise his unit's low morale and to receive more supplies and better equipment.

In November 1944 the 1st Cossack Division was taken over by the Waffen-SS. The SS Führungshauptamt reorganized the division and used further Cossack combat units from the army and the Ordnungspolizei to form a 2nd Cossack Division. Both divisions were placed under the command of the XV SS Cossack Cavalry Corps on 1 February 1945. With the transfer of the Volunteer Cossack-Stamm-Regiment 5 from the Freiwilligen-Stamm-Division on the same day the takeover of the Cossack units by the Waffen-SS was complete. According to Samuel J. Newland, the Corps, composed of the 1st and 2nd Cavalry Brigades and the 1st and 2nd Division, was actually formed on 25 February 1945, when it was officially created by the High Command. The Corps was initially subordinated to the Army Group F in Croatia, and since March 1945 to the Army Group E in Croatia. During their time there, they were known by the locals as "Čerkezi" ("Circassians"), despite the Corps' Cossack ethnic makeup.

The Corps supported the German offensive Operation Spring Awakening in Hungary by launching an offensive against a Soviet bridgehead at Valpovo on the Drava. During April the Corps was engaged in minor actions and then began to withdraw from Yugoslavia on 3 May 1945. The superior officers had concluded that the Corps should fight their way back to Austria in order to be captured by the British. According to one source Pannwitz felt that the West would have great use for the Corps as a military anti-Bolshevik eastern formation. The 2nd Division covered the withdrawal of the 1st Division against partisan forces. Unaffected by the German surrender on 8 May and partisan demands to surrender, the Cossack units continued fighting on their way to the British zone. On 10 May Pannwitz surrendered to the British, while the last Division elements reached the British zone on 13 May 1945.

Repatriation

Though the Division had fought westwards to surrender to the western Allies, the British later surrendered all Cossack units to the Red Army. Several thousand were killed in a mass execution near Lienz, Austria, while the commanding officers, including von Pannwitz, were put on trial and executed in 1947. Gravestones near Lienz mark the location of the mass graves.

See also 
Collaboration during World War II
Waffen-SS foreign volunteers and conscripts

Notes

References

Further reading
 François de Lannoy: Les Cosaques de Pannwitz: 1942 - 1945. Bayeux: Heimdal, 2000. 
 Samuel J. Newland: Cossacks in the German Army. U.S.Army War College, Frank Cass and Co. Ltd 1991, 
 Brent Mueggenberg | The Cossack Struggle Against Communism, 1917 - 1945 | Jefferson: McFarland, 2019 |

Cossack military units and formations
Foreign volunteer units of the Wehrmacht
Foreign volunteer units of the Waffen-SS
Waffen-SS corps
Cavalry corps of Germany
Military units and formations established in 1945
Military units and formations disestablished in 1945
Russian collaborators with Nazi Germany
Russian Liberation Army